Glyphis pagoda is an extinct river shark from the Miocene.

Fossil locations
Fossils are found in South Asia.

References

Glyphis (shark)
Fossil taxa described in 1901